Lionel Thomas Courtenay (1 December 1879 – 11 July 1935) was an Australian politician. Born in Sydney, where he was educated, he became a builder and a company director. He was involved in local politics, sitting on Mascot Council, Mosman Council and Sydney City Council. In 1932, he was elected to the New South Wales Legislative Council as a member of the United Australia Party. He left the Council in 1934 to contest the Australian Senate as a UAP candidate for New South Wales, in which he was successful. However, he died on 11 July 1935, 11 days after he formally became a Senator, necessitating the appointment of Guy Arkins to replace him.

References

Australian builders
United Australia Party members of the Parliament of Australia
Members of the Australian Senate for New South Wales
Members of the Australian Senate
Members of the New South Wales Legislative Council
1879 births
1935 deaths
20th-century Australian politicians